Lucio Flavio is a 1977 Brazilian film directed by Héctor Babenco based on the book of the same name by José Louzeiro, who co-wrote the screenplay. It stars Reginaldo Faria as Lúcio Flávio, a famous bandit in Rio de Janeiro in the 1970s. Babenco did not want to limit the story to Lúcio Flávio, and stated it was also a film about Esquadrão da Morte, a death squad from the 1960s.

Cast
Reginaldo Faria as Lúcio Flávio
Ana Maria Magalhães as Janice
Grande Otelo as Dondinho
Ivan Cândido as Bechara
Lady Francisco as Lígia
Milton Gonçalves as 132
Paulo César Peréio as Dr. Moretti
Stepan Nercessian
José Dumont

Release and reception
It premiered on November 22, 1977 at the 1st São Paulo International Film Festival, where it was elected the Best Film by the audience. In February 1978, it won the Best Actor (Faria), Best Supporting Actor (Cândido), Best Cinematography and Best Editing awards at the Gramado Film Festival. The film also entered the Taormina Film Fest, where it won the Best Actor Award. It debuted on the commercial circuit with 100 copies, breaking King Kongs 81, on February 27, 1978. As of November 2014, Lucio Flavio was the sixth most-watched Brazilian film with an audience of 5,401,325.

References

External links

1977 crime drama films
1977 films
Brazilian crime drama films
Films directed by Héctor Babenco
Films based on non-fiction books
Films based on biographies